California's 71st State Assembly district is one of 80 California State Assembly districts. It is currently represented by Republican Kate Sanchez

District profile 
The district encompasses much of San Diego County's backcountry and East County regions, as well as a primarily mountainous portion of Riverside County. While most of the district's area consists of rural mountain country and desert, much of the population is clustered in the suburban southwestern part near San Diego.

Riverside County – 1.9%
 Aguanga
 Anza
 Fern Valley
 Idyllwild
 Mountain Center
 Pine Cove
 Pinyon Pines
 Sage
 Valle Vista

San Diego County – 13.6%
 Alpine
 Borrego Springs
 Descanso
 El Cajon
 Eucalyptus Hills
 Granite Hills
 Harbison Canyon
 Jacumba Hot Springs
 Jamul
 Julian
 La Presa – partial
 Lakeside
 Ramona
 Rancho San Diego
 San Diego Country Estates
 Santee
 Spring Valley
 Winter Gardens

Election results from statewide races

List of Assembly Members 
Due to redistricting, the 71st district has been moved around different parts of the state. The current iteration resulted from the 2011 redistricting by the California Citizens Redistricting Commission.

Election results 1992 - present

2020

2018

2016

2014

2012

2010

2008

2006

2004

2002

2000

1998

1996

1994

1992

See also 
 California State Assembly
 California State Assembly districts
 Districts in California

References

External links 
 District map from the California Citizens Redistricting Commission

71
Government of San Diego County, California
Assembly
East County (San Diego County)
Mountain Empire (San Diego County)
Anza-Borrego Desert State Park
Cleveland National Forest
El Cajon, California
Laguna Mountains
Ramona, California
San Bernardino National Forest
San Jacinto Mountains
Santa Rosa Mountains (California)
Santee, California